James Barber  was a New Zealand rugby footballer who represented New Zealand in rugby league.

Rugby union career
 Barber originally played rugby union and represented Wellington. He played at fullback or scrum-half and was part of the side that won the Ranfurly Shield.

Rugby league career
Barber originally missed selection for the professional All Blacks for the 1907–1908 tour of Great Britain and Australia but was placed on stand by. By the time the side reached Australia in 1908 the side was short of backs, due to several players opting to remain in Britain, and Barber was called over to join the squad. He played in the first ever trans-Tasman test which was the debut match of the Australia national rugby league team. Barber would go on to appear in all three test matches against Australia.

Barber later captained the New Zealand side in its 1909 tour of Australia. His last game for New Zealand was in 1912.

In 1912 he was in Petone's side that won the inaugural Wellington Rugby League competition. Barber captained Wellington between 1911 and 1914, including Wellington's 1913 victory over Auckland.

Legacy

References

Footballers who switched code
New Zealand national rugby league team captains
New Zealand national rugby league team players
New Zealand rugby league players
New Zealand rugby union players
Petone Panthers players
Rugby league centres
Rugby league halfbacks
Rugby league players from Wellington Region
Rugby union fullbacks
Rugby union players from the Wellington Region
Rugby union scrum-halves
Wellington rugby league team players
Wellington rugby union players
Year of birth missing
Year of death missing